Pairan may refer to:

Peeran, village in Mansehra District, Khyber-Pakhtunkhwa province, Pakistan
Payra-sur-l'Hers, commune in Aude department, France
Failan, 2001 South Korean film